Harold Treherne (c. 1884 – after 1908) of Brighton, England, was a stamp forger notable for his forgeries of the stamps of India and Australia who was known as The Brighton forger and his works as Brighton forgeries.

First forgeries
Treherne appears to have entered the forgery business about 1902 or slightly earlier when he was working as a clerk in Brighton. He would have been aged about 18 in 1902.

Treherne at first produced only fake overprints and surcharges, or imperforate whole stamps as he lacked perforating or rouletting equipment and the overprints and surcharges only required simple printing in black ink. Later he moved on to more sophisticated forgeries.

The Excelsior Traders' Supply Company in London supplied Treherne with a large number of zinc cliches and printing plates including overprints, surcharges and complete stamps.

Treherne also had a contact in India, a Mr Thomas Hill in Bombay, who supplied him with genuine used Indian stamps to which fake overprints were applied and which were returned in lots of 1000 of a kind for sale in India.

Later forgeries
Some of Treherene's best work is thought to be forgeries of the stamps of Jammu and Kashmir which he produced in whole sheets showing all of the varieties of type on the originals.

Aliases
Treherne used the aliases G. Arnold, H. Curtis, H. Hordern, M. Melville, J. or T. Morton, R. Newman, A. West and possibly others.

Trapped
Treherne's work started to be noticed in 1903 and 1904 but it was not at first attributed to him. In 1903 A.B. Kay wrote about forged stamps of Kashmir in Stanley Gibbons' Monthly Journal and in 1904 Charles Nissen wrote more generally in The Stamp Collectors' Annual about the wide variety of forgeries for sale in Brighton.

In 1907 a member of the Stamp Trade Protection Association became concerned about the volume of orders for common stamps received from Treherne that could be easily manipulated by the application of fake surcharges or overprints. After a member received an order for a large number of Great Britain penny reds, the association set a trap for Treherne by marking some with a pin prick. When the stamps were eventually sold, they had acquired a CYPRUS overprint not present originally, thus greatly increasing their value.

Treherne was arrested on 2 August 1907 and was found to have 447 dies or plates in his possession. He pleaded guilty at his trial and sentence was deferred. In the meantime, the Commissioners of Inland Revenue brought additional charges against Treherne of being in possession of dies, plates and instruments for making fictitious stamps and he was found guilty of these charges and fined £15 and costs. In January 1908 the earlier case on which sentence had been deferred was reopened and he was sentenced to four months hard labour plus an additional month for failure to pay the earlier fine.

See also
Philatelic fakes and forgeries

References

External links
Brighton Forgeries at kashmirstamps.ca

Stamp forgers
1880s births
Year of death unknown
British stamp dealers